John Joseph William Molesworth Oxley (1784 – 25 May 1828)
 was an explorer and surveyor of Australia in the early period of British colonisation.   He served as Surveyor General of New South Wales and is perhaps best known for his two expeditions into the interior of New South Wales and his exploration of the Tweed River and the Brisbane River in what is now the state of Queensland.

Early life 
John Oxley was born at Kirkham Abbey near Westow in Yorkshire, Great Britain. He was baptised at Bulmer on 6 July 1784, his parents recorded as John and Arabella Oxley.

Naval career 
He travelled to Australia in October 1802 as master's mate of the naval vessel , which carried out coastal surveying (including the survey of Western Port), and this first stay in the Colonies would last for five years. In 1805, Oxley became acting lieutenant of the Buffalo and traveled to Van Diemen's Land the following year in charge of the Estramina.

To take up this appointment he sailed out again to NSW on the Speke as part of the Transport Board. He arrived in November 1808 with £800 of freight transport. In 1809 Porpoise visited Van Diemen's Land, carrying as a passenger Governor William Bligh, who had been deposed in the Rum Rebellion. When Bligh was deposed, Oxley denied he supported Macarthur but his letters showed that he was close to him. In 1810, Oxley returned to England. During this period, Oxley sought the positions of Naval Officer and Surveyor-General. He retired from the Navy in 1811 and was briefly in an engagement to Elizabeth Macarthur the following year.

Surveyor General 
In 1812, Oxley travelled to Sydney as Surveyor-General of the Minstrel. Oxley's appointment was at the time of Lachlan Macquarie's Governorship. Macquarie encouraged exploration – he had sent George Evans to confirm the exploratory work of Wentworth, Blaxland and Lawson over the Blue Mountains, instigated the building of the road over the Blue Mountains in 1814–1815, and had travelled to Bathurst immediately William Cox had completed it. From there he had sent George Evans on an expedition of exploration up the Lachlan River in May 1815.

Now Macquarie wanted the Lachlan and Macquarie River explored thoroughly. Opening up of the new lands over the mountains had created enthusiasm for further discoveries about them and the Macquarie River. Mysteriously, the Macquarie and the Lachlan flowed westwards to the interior of the country and not easterly towards the coastline. Successively, in 1817 and 1818 Governor Macquarie appointed John Oxley in charge of two expeditions to investigate these rivers.

On the 1817 Lachlan expedition, Oxley was to come across marshy country and conclude this inland area was uninhabitable. If he had pressed on for two more days he would have reached the Murrumbidgee River. Oxley reported that, in his opinion, the Lachlan flowed into an extensive series of swamps, "which were, perhaps, the margin of a great inland sea."
Similarly, the Macquarie expedition the following year in 1818 came to a halt on that river at the Macquarie Marshes in a good season for the marshes as the Macquarie was in flood replenishing these vital wetlands. Oxley tried hard to proceed through them but couldn't do so. He returned to the encampment of the rest of his party now convinced that these westward flowing rivers terminated in an inland sea, and he had been on the swampy edge of it.

Through Oxley, the theory of the Australian inland sea was fed and perpetuated,

Lachlan River expedition, 1817

In March 1817 John Oxley was instructed to take charge of an expedition to explore and survey the course of the Lachlan River. He left Sydney on 6 April 1817 with George Evans as second-in-command, and Allan Cunningham as a botanist. The previous year, Evans had accompanied Macquarie over the Blue Mountains to Bathurst on the celebratory completion of Cox's road, where Macquarie had directed him on an exploratory journey which resulted in Evans reaching and naming the Lachlan River west of Bathurst in May 1815. The party also included William Parr as a mineralogist and draftsman.

Oxley's party reached Bathurst after a week, where they were briefly detained by bad weather. On 25 April 1817, they reached the Lachlan River Depot which had been prepared for them (with provisions and supplies) in advance by a separate party under the direction of William Cox. From here, they commenced following its course, with part of the stores being conveyed in boats. As the exploring party travelled westward the country surrounding the rising river was found to be increasingly inundated. On 12 May, west of the present township of Forbes, they found their progress impeded by an extensive marsh. They travelled down a northern branch of the river to Mount Mulguthery where they were forced to return up the river.

After retracing their route for a short distance they then proceeded in a south-westerly direction through Ungarie and past Weethalle, intending to travel overland to the southern Australian coastline. By the end of May, the party found themselves in a dry scrubby country northeast of Yenda where they ascended several peaks in the Cocoparra National Park. Shortage of water and the death of two horses forced Oxley's return, passing near Rankins Springs to the Lachlan River.

On 23 June the Lachlan River near Merrigal Bridge was reached: "we suddenly came upon the banks of the river… which we had quitted nearly five weeks before". They followed the course of the Lachlan River through Hillston and Booligal for a fortnight. The party encountered much-flooded country and reached a point five kilometres south-west of Booligal which was their last campsite. On 7 July Oxley proceeded another 16 km along the flooded river and recorded that "it was with infinite regret and pain that I was forced to conclude, that the interior of this vast country is a marsh and uninhabitable". Oxley resolved to turn back and after resting for two days the exploring party began to retrace their steps along the Lachlan River.

They left the Lachlan at Kiacatoo up-stream of the present site of Lake Cargelligo and crossed to the Bogan River and then across to the Wellington Valley on the upper waters of the Macquarie River, which they followed back to Bathurst (arriving on 29 August 1817). The Wellington Valley would later be made the site of a convict settlement mostly for convict 'specials'.

Macquarie River expedition, 1818
Although disappointed by his Lachlan expedition, in not following the river all the way to its end, John Oxley took up Macquarie's next directive to explore the Macquarie River. He departed from Bathurst on 28 May 1818 with an exploration party that comprised Deputy Surveyor General George Evans, Oxley's friend Dr John Harris, a botanist named Charles Frazer, and twelve convict men.  The names of the twelve convict men were later recorded by Governor Macquarie in his diary, upon the party's eventual return to Sydney.  "The following are their Names: William Warner, Patrick Byrne, James Blake, George Simpson, James Williams, John Williams, Francis Lloyd, Barnard Butler, Thomas Ellis, John Dwyer, Richard Watts, Henry Shippey." He also noted that the first five men listed had also been with Oxley on the previous year's 1817 exploratory journey to the Lachlan.

They also took boats with them and nearly two dozen horses. The party would get upriver to the Macquarie Marshes, turn north-east to the Warrumbungle mountains crossing the Castlereagh River in the process, view the rich Liverpool Plains, come across the Peel River and the Hastings River to reach the NSW coast and the site of present-day Port Macquarie. These European sightings delivered a real boost to the NSW colony.

On 12 June 1818 Oxley was near the site that would become Dubbo. He wrote that he had passed that day 'over a very beautiful country, thinly wooded and apparently safe from the highest floods...'. they continued to follow the Macquarie River through land that became increasingly flat. On 27 June they spotted a small hill and named it Mt Harris in honour of John Harris accompanying him. On the same day the mountains in the distance to the east (now known by their Aboriginal name, the Warrumbungles) were named Arbuthnot's Ranges for the Rt Hon C. Arbuthnot of H.M. Treasury. Mt Harris is 54 km N-NW of present-day Warren.

They continued by boat and horses until they reached the Macquarie Marshes where it spread out through the reeds and Oxley was unable to locate the course of the river any further downstream. He wrote:

"But if an opinion may be permitted to be hazarded from actual appearances, mine is decidedly in favour of our being in the immediate vicinity of an inland sea, or lake, most probably a shoal one, and gradually filling up by numerous depositions from the high lands, left by waters which flow into it."

From here he retraced steps to Mt Harris, NW of present-day Warren, and camped from early July while he sent George Evans forward with a few men to scout a route to the north-east. On Evans' return, the expedition crossed the river that Oxley would name the Castlereagh, went towards the Warrumbungle Mountains, which he named at the time 'Arbuthnot's Range' and easterly through the Gooriananwa Gap From here they moved forward to come upon the rich soil of the Liverpool Plains.

On 26 August 1818 they climbed a hill and saw before them rich, fertile land (Peel River), near the present site of Tamworth. Continuing further east they crossed the Great Dividing Range passing by the Apsley Falls on 13 September 1818 which Oxley named the Bathurst Falls. He described it as "one of the most magnificent waterfalls we have seen".

Upon reaching the Hastings River the exploring party followed it to its mouth, discovering that it flowed into the sea at a spot which Oxley named Port Macquarie.

In his diary of 27 November 1818, Governor Macquarie listed the twelve men who accompanied Oxley and Evans on this expedition (see above). He wrote:
"I inspected and spoke to the 12 Men who Accompanied Mr. Oxley on his last Expedition – and in his own presence returned them my thanks for their steady good and obedient Conduct on the Expedition; and being all Convicts I have promised to give them Conditional Pardons as a reward for their good behaviour."

Shoalhaven and Jervis Bay expedition, 1819 
Oxley and Assistant Surveyor-General James Meehan led two separate but concurrent expeditions, in late 1819. Oxley proceeded down the coast by sea to the Shoalhaven. Meehan went overland, starting from the Minnamurra River and meeting Oxley at the Shoalhaven. Oxley's report of good soils in the area increased interest in agricultural settlement around Gerringong and the Shoalhaven. Oxley's report of the western shore of Jervis Bay, was far less favourable. He stated, "We saw no place on which even a Cabbage might be planted with a prospect of success" and that "perhaps a more miserable sterile Country was never traversed by man".

Oxley's 1823 expedition to Brisbane River

In 1823, Governor Brisbane sent Oxley north by boat in search of a site for an alternative penal settlement for the most difficult convicts.
"A deep rich valley clothed with magnificent trees, the beautiful uniformity of which was only interrupted by the turns and windings of the river, which here and there appeared like small lakes. The background was Mt. Warning. The view was altogether beautiful beyond description. The scenery here exceeded anything I have previously seen in Australia." As Surveyor General, Oxley made a close examination of the Tweed River and Port Curtis, and sources connected that investigation, principally the manuscript journal kept by Oxley, and the published Narrative of John Uniack, who accompanied Oxley.

Rounding Moreton Island, he came across two escaped convicts who had been living with the Aboriginal people there. With their assistance, he was shown, and named, the Brisbane River. He   recommend this place for the site of the convict settlement, which became Moreton Bay, and later the city of Brisbane. A monument was built at North Quay in 1924 to commemorate the site of his landing in Brisbane. He then travelled further north to explore Port Curtis (the site of Gladstone) and continued to explore the region, which is now known as South East Queensland.

In 1824 Oxley, accompanied by Allan Cunningham returned to the Brisbane River and, travelling further up, then located the Bremer River.

Personal life 

He named this property Kirkham and raised and bred sheep there. He was also briefly a director of the Bank of New South Wales. He was one of five members of the original 1824 New South Wales Legislative Council, but was not reappointed when the Council was reconstituted in 1825.

Oxley had three daughters out of wedlock with two women, before he married a third woman. Two of these daughters were with Charlotte Thorpe and born before his inland expeditions: Jeanette b. 1813 (never married) who died in 1875 and is buried in the historic cemetery at South Head, and Frances b. 1815 who married William Waugh and is buried in Tenterfield. He had another daughter, Louisa b. 1821, with Elizabeth Marmon. This child drowned (aged 3) in early December 1824 in a well opposite Oxley's house in Macquarie Street, Sydney. The newspaper report was as follows:

"An Inquest was held on Saturday last, on the body of Louisa Oxley, a lovely infant of four years old, that fell into a well 100 feet deep, close under the Hyde Park Barrack wall, and was drowned before aid could be afforded; to which effect a Verdict was returned. The criminality of suffering a well to be so publicly exposed, calls forth appropriate indignation."

In October 1821, Oxley married Emma Norton (1798–1885), the youngest sister of the solicitor James Norton. Emma had followed her brother out to New South Wales from Sussex after he had established himself as an attorney in the colony.

Oxley and Emma Norton had a daughter and two sons. The elder, John Norton Oxley became a Member of the Legislative Assembly, representing the Western Division of Camden, in the first Parliament after the establishment of responsible government in 1856. He sponsored the Broad Gauge Act which encouraged the use of wagons with broad wheels instead of narrow-tired drays in order to cause less wear on public roads; this measure made him unpopular with the farmers and carriers in his electorate and he lost his seat. The younger son, Henry Oxley, also became a Member of the Legislative Assembly, representing the Electoral district of Camden between 1859 and 1860.

Oxley suffered with illness throughout his service, caused by the difficulties of his expeditions. He finally succumbed to his illness and died on 25 May 1828 at his Kirkham property, Kirkham, New South Wales, outside Camden, aged 44. An obituary notice was published in the Government Gazette of May 27, 1828

Legacy 
 A statue of Oxley (1891), in a niche on the Bridge Street facade of the Department of Lands building, in Sydney. 
To celebrate the centenary of Oxley's discovery of Brisbane, a statue was erected in his honour in 1924. 
 John Oxley Memorial, was erected in Redcliffe, Queensland in 1932
In 1976, Oxley was honoured on a postage stamp bearing his portrait issued by Australia Post. *In 2012 a metal silhouette of Oxley was unveiled in Kirkham.
Oxley's Memorial, an anchor from survey ship , next to the Tamworth road at Hallsville, New South Wales, marking the route Oxley took in 1818. Erected 1926.
 John Oxley Landing Memorial erected on 3 December 1983 in Newstead House Park, Newstead, Queensland

Places and miscellaneous items bearing his name include:
Electoral districts in New South Wales and Queensland including:
the Division of Oxley, a federal electorate located in Queensland
the Electoral district of Oxley, a state electorate located in New South Wales
the Electoral district of Oxley, a former state electorate located in Queensland
Oxley, a suburb in the Australian Capital Territory
Oxley, a suburb in Queensland 
 Oxley Road, a main road in the southern suburbs in Brisbane 
 Oxley College (Burradoo), New South Wales
John Oxley Drive, a road in Frenchs Forest
John Oxley Library, part of the State Library of Queensland, is dedicated to preserving and making available Queensland's documentary history
John Oxley Library Fellowship, worth 
John Oxley Memory Award, awarded by the State Library of Queensland
John Oxley papers, a collection of letters mostly from John to his wife Emma
John Oxley Memorial Hospital (now demolished), in Wacol, Queensland 
John Oxley Reserve, Murrumba Downs, Queensland, a  nature reserve with sporting fields, playground and a nature walk leading to the Pine River.
John Oxley Village, an on-campus residence of the Charles Sturt University Bathurst campus, colloquially known as "JOV" to students, and birthplace of the Village Fair music festival.
Oxley, a town in New South Wales 
 Oxley Street in Townsville, Queensland
Oxley Creek, a creek in Queensland
Oxley High School in Tamworth
Oxley Avenue a main parade in Redcliffe, Queensland a peninsula he visited on his journey through the waters of Moreton Bay
Oxley Highway, in New South Wales
Oxley Island, located on the north coast of New South Wales
Oxley Park and Oxley Vale, both suburbs in New South Wales
Oxley's Plains, in north-east Victoria, on which the Oxley township grew, named by Hume and Hovell during their exploration from the Yass Plains to Port Phillip in 1824
Oxley Wild Rivers National Park
A Junee Public School house
Oxley River, located in the Far North Coast of NSW. Oxley river feeds into the Tweed River, at Byangum, near Murwillumbah NSW.
Ships:
 SS John Oxley, a steamship built in 1927 for the Queensland State Government, and since 1970 a vessel of the Sydney Heritage Fleet.
 HMAS Oxley, an Odin class submarine launched in 1926 and transferred to the Royal Navy in 1931, and lost in 1939.
 HMAS Oxley (S 57), an Oberon class submarine launched in 1965, decommissioned in 1992. The bow section of HMAS Oxley is on display outside the Western Australian Maritime Museum.

References

Further reading 
 Johnson, Richard, The Search for the Inland Sea: John Oxley, Explorer, 1783–1828, Melbourne University Press, 2001.

External links 
 
 
 Journals of Two Expeditions into the Interior of New South Wales, undertaken by order of the British government in the years 1817-18
 The Allan Cunningham Project, Allan Cunningham, botanist explorer 1791–1839, accompanied John Oxley on his journey along the Lachlan River in 1817
 John Oxley Library, a part of the State Library of Queensland
 Acc. 33036 John Oxley Papers at State Library of Queensland , a digitised collection of letters and papers from John Oxley and other family members.
 Colonial Secretary's papers 1822-1877, State Library of Queensland- includes digitised correspondence and letters written by Oxley to the Colonial Secretary of New South Wales, including matters relating to the Moreton Bay settlement

 

1784 births
1828 deaths
Royal Navy officers
English explorers
Explorers of Australia
Explorers of Queensland
People from Ryedale (district)
Surveyors General of New South Wales
Maritime exploration of Australia
English emigrants to colonial Australia
History of Brisbane
Pre-Separation Queensland
Members of the New South Wales Legislative Council
19th-century Australian politicians